The Tamaki Strait is one of several passes between the islands of the inner Hauraki Gulf, close to the mouth of the Waitematā Harbour near Auckland city in New Zealand.

The strait separates the North Island mainland from Waiheke Island along the southern shore of the Gulf, due east of Auckland city.

Hauraki Gulf
Straits of New Zealand
Landforms of the Auckland Region